The Running Man is a 2004 young adult novel by Australian author Michael Gerard Bauer. It was the 2005 CBCA Book of the Year for Older Readers, and also won the Courier Mail 2005 People's Choice Award for Younger Readers.

Plot summary 
Joseph Davidson was a quiet, self-conscious fourteen-year-old boy and a talented artist. His world changes, however, when he is asked to draw a portrait of his mysterious neighbour Tom Leyton who was a Vietnam veteran who for thirty years has lived alone with his sister Caroline, raising his silkworms and hiding from prying eyes. Because of this he is the subject of ugly gossip and rumour, much of it led by neighbour Mrs. Mossop, who views Leyton’s brief teaching career with suspicion.
When Joseph finally meets his reclusive neighbour he discovers a cold, brooding man lost deep within his own cocoon of silence. He soon realises that in order to truly draw Tom Leyton, he must find the courage to unlock the man’s dark and perhaps dangerous secrets.
But Joseph has his own secrets, including the pain of his damaged relationship with his absent father and his childhood fear of the Running Man – a local character whose wild appearance and strange manner of moving everywhere at a frantic pace terrified him when he was a small boy. These dreams suddenly return when Joseph is forced to face his fears and doubts regarding Tom Leyton.
As Joseph moves deeper and deeper into his neighbour’s world he confronts not only Tom Leyton’s private hell, but also his own relationship with his father, and ultimately the dishevelled, lurching figure of the Running Man.

Awards and recognition 
The Running Man was named Children's Book Council of Australia Book of the Year for Older Readers in 2005. It also won the Courier Mail 2006 People's Choice Award for Younger Readers, was listed as one of the top 10 books for young adults for 2004 in Magpies magazine and was short-listed for the 2006 NSW Premier's Award and Victorian Premier's Award and the 2006 South Australian Festival Awards for Literature.

References

External links
Books From Our Backyard review

2004 Australian novels
Australian young adult novels
Novels by Michael Gerard Bauer
CBCA Children's Book of the Year Award-winning works
Omnibus Books books